Actin-binding LIM protein 3 is a protein that in humans is encoded by the ABLIM3 gene.

Function 

The LIM domain is a double zinc finger structure that promotes protein-protein interactions. LIM domain proteins, such as ABLIM3, play roles in embryonic development, cell lineage determination, and cancer. An important paralog of this gene is LIMS1.

Clinical relevance 

Diseases associated with ABLIM3 include hepatoblastoma, and among its related super-pathways are axon guidance and DCC mediated attractive signaling.

References

Further reading

External links